Takakkawia is a genus of sponge in the order Protomonaxonida and the family Takakkawiidae. It is known from the Middle Cambrian Burgess Shale that reached around 4 cm in height. Its structure comprises four columns of multi-rayed, organic spicules (perhaps originally calcareous or siliceous) that align to form flanges.  The spicules form blade-like structures, ornamented with concentric rings.

It was first described in 1920 by Charles Doolittle Walcott. Takakkaw Falls which mark the start of the trail to Fossil Ridge. 1377 specimens of Takakkawia are known from the Greater Phyllopod bed, where they comprise 2.62% of the community.

References

External links 
 
 Image of fossil from the Peabody Museum of Natural History 
 Takakkawia at fossilworks

Burgess Shale fossils
Protomonaxonida
Burgess Shale sponges
Prehistoric sponge genera
Taxa named by Charles Doolittle Walcott
Fossil taxa described in 1920
Cambrian genus extinctions